12th arrondissement may refer to,
12th arrondissement of Marseille
12th arrondissement of Paris
12th arrondissement of the Littoral Department, Benin

Arrondissement name disambiguation pages